WBUP (channel 10) is a television station licensed to Ishpeming, Michigan, United States, serving as the ABC affiliate for the Central and Western Upper Peninsula of Michigan. It is owned by The Marks Group alongside Calumet-licensed CW+ affiliate WBKP (channel 5). Both stations share studios on Ash Street in Ishpeming Township, while WBUP's transmitter is located south of Ely Township in unincorporated Marquette County.

Since WBUP cannot be seen over-the-air in the Keweenaw Peninsula, it is simulcast in high definition on WBKP's second digital subchannel (virtual and VHF channel 5.2) from a transmitter on Tolonen Hill near Painesdale of Adams Township.

History
In August 1997, the area's original ABC affiliate WBKP launched repeater station W28BX on channel 28 in Marquette to cover the city proper. Since this low-powered over-the-air signal was very weak, it could only be picked up in Marquette and Negaunee. On January 2, 2003, WBKP replaced the low-powered repeater with full-time satellite WBUP. This aired a full-powered analog signal on VHF channel 10 and, at this point, WBUP and WBKP took the on-air branding "ABC 5&10".

In January 2004, the Scanlan family (who also owned WGTU/WGTQ in the Northern Lower Peninsula) sold WBUP/WBKP and WBKB-TV in Alpena to Lake Superior Community Broadcasting, a company owned by Stephen Marks of Maryland. In July 2007, the two stations split with WBKP becoming a CW affiliate (as part of The CW Plus national service) while WBUP remained with ABC.

On February 11, 2013 at about 8:35 p.m., WBUP became a victim of broadcast signal intrusion when an unidentified hacker had hijacked the Emergency Alert System network to transmit a false EAS message. This was broadcast during an episode of The Bachelor which simply stated that "dead bodies are rising from their graves and they are attacking the living. Do not attempt to approach these bodies, as they are considered dangerous." It was revealed that a default password for the networks was being used, and a few minutes later, the station sent an official on-screen message apologizing for any confusion. The attack also happened during prime time programming locally on WNMU-TV, KENW in Portales, New Mexico, and KRTV in Great Falls, Montana. The hacker was arrested several days later and sentenced to six months probation.

Programming
Syndicated programming on WBUP includes Modern Family and Entertainment Tonight among others. The station is also part of the Detroit Lions Television Network and carries the Detroit Lions' preseason NFL games as well as the team's coach's show on Sundays during the regular season.

News operation
For its entire existence, WLUC-TV (channel 6) has held the number one spot in local Nielsen ratings by a wide margin. The NBC affiliate has always had a much larger news department than WBUP which has only been offering local newscasts since 2004. An earlier attempt seen on WBKP from July 1997 until March 2002 was abandoned due to low ratings and budget cuts. WBUP currently broadcasts local news weekday mornings at 6:30 in addition to weeknights at 5:30, 6, 10 (on WBKP) and 11. However, unlike most ABC affiliates, it does not offer newscasts in several dayparts (such as a full weekday morning show, weeknights at 5 and weekends).

For most of its history, then-CBS and now-MyNetworkTV affiliate WJMN-TV (channel 3) only provided brief Upper Peninsula-specific news and weather cut-ins that were taped in advance from then-semi-satellite WFRV-TV in Green Bay, Wisconsin. WJMN finally began airing full, live newscasts (seen weeknights at 6 and 11) with a Marquette focus on April 21, 2014. 

On January 21, 2022, MeTV affiliate WZMQ launched a CBS affiliation on its DT2 subchannel, complete with its own newscasts. Despite all these attempts bringing competition to the market, WLUC continues its dominance with consistent viewership.

WBUP's current news operation was established in 2004 shortly after  acquired WBUP/WBKP. The shows were originally known as UGN News (with "UGN" meaning "Upper Great <Lakes> Network") and had a simulcasting arrangement with WBKB. Likewise, the programs featured regionalized news and weather coverage from the entire Upper and Northern Lower Peninsulas. In 2006, UGN News was re-focused to the Upper Peninsula and only originated from WBUP/WBKP. After becoming a separate station and the primary producer of newscasts, WBUP re-branded its newscasts to ABC 10 News NOW.

In December 2007, it began producing the area's first primetime newscast on WBKP. Known as CW 5 News NOW, this thirty-minute program is seen weeknights at 10. On September 8, 2009, rival WLUC added a half-hour local newscast seen at the same time to its Fox-affiliated second digital subchannel. In September 2012, WBUP began airing its first-ever weekday morning newscast, known as ABC 10 News NOW This Morning, seen at 6:30. To cover the Keweenaw Peninsula, the station also operates an advertising sales office and news bureau on East Montezuma Avenue in Houghton (building shared with WOLV-FM 97.7, WHKB-FM 102.3, and WCCY-AM 1400). Since there is no weather department, all weather segments originate from WBKB's studios in Alpena and are taped in advance.

Technical information

Subchannels
The station's digital signal is multiplexed:

Analog-to-digital conversion
WBUP shut down its analog signal, over VHF channel 10, on June 12, 2009, and "flash-cut" its digital signal into operation on VHF channel 10. Since it was granted an original construction permit after the Federal Communications Commission (FCC) finalized the DTV allotment plan on April 21, 1997, this station did not receive a companion channel for a digital television station. It then began offering a standard definition simulcast of WBKP on a new second digital subchannel in order to expand that station's broadcasting radius.

References

External links
WBUP "ABC 10"
WBKP "CW 5"

ABC network affiliates
Television channels and stations established in 2003
2003 establishments in Michigan
BUP